Kabibullah Kabenuly Dzhakupov (born 16 September 1949) is a Kazakhstani politician and civil engineer. He served as Chair of the Mazhilis from 3 April 2014 to 25 March 2016. He has served as a member of the Mazhilis since 2007.

Career
Kabibullah Dzhakupov was born into a Muslim family on 16 September 1949 in a village in the West Kazakhstan Region. He studied to be a civil engineer at the Tselinograd (Astana) Civil Engineering Institute and graduated in 1972. In 1981 Dzhakupov became politically active on the local level in Oral. From 19 January 1993 to 18 December 2000 he served as the akim of the West Kazakhstan Region.

Dzhakupov was chosen to the Mazhilis in the 2007 parliamentary elections. He was subsequently reelected in the 2012 elections for the Nur Otan party. On 3 September 2012 he was elected deputy chair of the Mazhilis after his predecessor Baktykozha Izmukhambetov was appointed as akim of Atyrau Region. On 3 April 2014 he was elected as the chair, succeeding Nurlan Nigmatulin. Dzhakupov obtained 103 votes for and one against. Dzhakupov was succeeded as deputy chair by Dariga Nazarbayeva who also became the parliamentary leader of Nur Otan. After Nazarbayeva was appointed as the Deputy Prime Minister of Kazakhstan on 11 September 2015, Dzhakupov succeeded her as the parliamentary leader. He continued to serve in the Mazhilis until its dissolution on 20 January 2016.

On 25 March 2016, Dzhakupov who formally held the seat as the chair of the Mazhilis was succeeded by Baktykozha Izmukhambetov while Gülmira Esimbaeva became the new parliamentary leader of Nur Otan.

References

1949 births
Living people
Chairmen of the Mazhilis
Members of the Mazhilis
Nur Otan politicians
People from West Kazakhstan Region